D-proline dehydrogenase (D-Pro DH, D-Pro dehydrogenase, dye-linked D-proline dehydrogenase) is an enzyme with systematic name D-proline:acceptor oxidoreductase. This enzyme catalyses the following chemical reaction

 D-proline + acceptor  1-pyrroline-2-carboxylate + reduced acceptor

This enzyme is a flavoprotein (FAD).

References

External links 
 

EC 1.5.99